The Wireless Theatre Company is an online audio theatre company specializing in creating modern audio drama. It was founded in July 2007 by Mariele Runacre Temple, daughter of actress Jenny Runacre.

Overview 
The company produces radio drama, audio comedy and short stories for digital download in MP3  format, creating a modern forum for radio productions and specialises in new writing from international authors, originally beginning as a not-for-profit company. In February 2008, Nicholas Parsons became patron of the company, recorded an interview and appeared at the company's official launch party in July 2008, along with Richard O'Brien.

It has showcased as of the end of 2013, 177 actors (a mix of established names - see below - and new performers to audio), as well as 43 new writers and 35 crew members and had won several radio awards and nominations for its output, all "designed to nurture and encourage fresh new writers, up and coming acting talent and bring audio theatre to the 'iPod generation'". Its recent output was named as one of the Best Twenty Radio Productions of 2012, while Mariele Runacre Temple was placed on the top 200 Sound Women List. It is a member of the Radio Independents Group and in 2011 won a place on the BBC Radio Preferred Supplier's List.

As of the end of 2013, the current website  is visited by 15,000 unique visitors per month, of which 7% become subscribers.

Notable developments (2008-2016) 
In May 2008, Prunella Scales starred in its production of the Youth of Old Age with Knight Mantell and directed The Ceremony, which featured Jenny Runacre. Wireless Theatre Company has also worked with Julian Glover, David Benson, Timothy West, Christopher Timothy and Josephine Tewson.  Glover worked on the company's first audio series, The Strange Case of Springheel'd Jack – the first series of The Springheel Saga – based around the legend of Springheeled Jack.

The Wireless Theatre Company has been featured in Metro and Live Radio Theatre? The Perfect Night Out or In in The Guardian.

Since early 2015 Wireless Theatre have been producing full length multi-cast dramas for Audible UK, including Passenger 23 starring Max Beesley and Rebecca Hall and the double Audie Award winning Jungle Book, The Mowgli Stories starring Bill Bailey, Richard E Grant and Martin Shaw.

Notable contributors 
The Wireless Theatre Company has attracted several notable contributors; in 2012 Stephen Fry recorded a guest appearance, playing a fictional version of himself, in the company's production of "We Are The BBC".

Wireless Theatre Live 
The company launched its LIVE recordings in 2008, the first being the Wireless Theatre Company pantomime, Pig in Boots written by Richard O'Brien in December 2008. Live productions include The Grimm of Stottesden Hall, loosely based on the stories of Edgar Allan Poe, and 2010: Space Commander!, both written by Stuart Price. The company produced a live radio recording of Frankie Howerd's play Not Tonight Caligula by Ray Galton and John Antrobus at Leicester Square Theatre, London, and a second Halloween special entitled Phonophobia, co-written by Robert Valentine and Gareth Parker. In 2011, it undertook a season of live recordings of Grimm's Fairytales at the Roundhouse Theatre, while since 2012 it has launched the London Horror Festival. 2013 saw live shows produced by Wireless Theatre in London (including a "Sci-Fi Showcase"  and a "36 Hour Theatre Challenge"  at the LOST Theatre) and at the Buxton Festival.

Wireless Theatre Kids 
In November 2010 the company launched Wireless Theatre Kids to produce original radio drama and stories for children.

Awards and nominations 

Since 2009 The Wireless Theatre Company has received several award nominations and awards, most notably in 2011 when it won Best Entertainment Producer and Best Online Multi-Platform Creator at The Radio Academy Radio Production Awards and in 2016 when it won two Audie awards for The Jungle Book, The Mowgli Stories produced for Audible UK.

2013 - Current (Documentaries, BBC Radio 4, Audible, New Model and Relaunch) 
2013 saw the company branch into documentaries, beginning with "Life At Death's Door", narrated by Brian Blessed, followed by "The Springheel Files", narrated by Cameron K. McEwan.

October saw its first production broadcast on BBC Radio 4 as part of the Wednesday Afternoon Play, written by Marty Ross, a dramatic adaptation of "The Lady Macbeth Of Mtsensk", directed by Cherry Cookson.

In the summer of 2013, it was announced that The Wireless Theatre Company would change its business model, relaunching as Wireless Theatre Ltd. This decision was made to help increase production and support the actors, writers and crew involved in the company, and as such, was seeking investment as a result, a move supported by Parsons as Company Patron in an online video.  As such, in December 2013, Wireless Theatre ceased to be a not-for-profit company and became a subscription-based audio platform.

At the end of 2013, it finished the year with releasing "Cross Party" co-written by Tom Harris (British politician) with his wife, Carolyn  and the second series of The Springheel Saga, The Legend Of Springheel'd Jack, featuring Nicholas Parsons. From 2015 to present day it combines in-house productions for the website subscribers with large-scale productions for Audible UK. The company has also partnered with AudioBoom to offer free drama and behind the scenes extras.

References

External links
Official homepage
Official Audio Boom channel for free content

2007 establishments in the United Kingdom
Theatre companies in the United Kingdom
British entertainment websites
British radio dramas